Kalelibelen was a town in ancient Pamphylia. 

Its site is located near Belenobası, in Asiatic Turkey.

References

Populated places in ancient Pamphylia
Former populated places in Turkey
History of Antalya Province